Anna Peck Sill (August 9, 1816 – June 18, 1889) was an American educator and the founder of Rockford Female Seminary (now Rockford University), a school for the Christian education of young women in Rockford, Illinois, as an adjunct to Beloit College of Beloit, Wisconsin. Sill and the seminary were so vitally related that the life-story of one was the history of the other. She took her inspiration from Mary Lyon and modeled the Rockford school after Mount Holyoke Seminary. Sill retired in 1884, after 35 years as Rockford's principal, five thousand women having graduated under her.

Early life and education
Anna Peck Sill was born in Burlington, New York, August 9, 1816. She was the youngest of ten children, and inherited the intellectual and moral qualities of a long line of Puritan ancestry.

The family was descended from John Sill, of England, who with his wife Joanna emigrated to the U.S. in 1637, and settled in Cambridge, Massachusetts, seven years after the settlement of the town, and the same year in which Harvard College was founded. About 1789, her grandparents removed with their families from Lyme, Connecticut, to Otsego County, New York, at that time a wilderness, and settled in the neighborhood of what is now Burlington. Her grandfather, Deacon Andrew Sill, was a prominent member of the Congregational Church in Lyme, and held the office of deacon for 31 years. He was a patriot soldier in the Revolutionary war.

Her father, Abel Sill, was a farmer, who died of typhoid fever in 1824, at the age of 50, when Anna was seven years old.

Her maternal grandfather, Hon. Jedediah Peck, filled several high positions as legislator and judge in New York State. He was the first to urge legislative action for the establishment of common schools and the abolition of imprisonment for debt. He was also a teacher, and was skilled in the sciences of navigation and surveying.

Her mother (died 1860), eldest daughter of Judge Peck, was a good scholar in her day, especially in mathematics. She was left by the death of her husband with the care of nine children -one having previously died- six sons and three daughters, of whom Anna was the youngest.

Sill was sent to school at the age of four. There, she was drilled in Webster's Spelling Book, Morse's Geography and Murray's Grammar, which she committed from beginning to end with no thought of its value, or scarcely of its meaning. Daboll's Arithmetic was finished when about thirteen years old "with the aid of a key". She was taught "reverence to teachers and to all strangers by the way to and from school". She was carefully trained in all household duties, including spinning, weaving and setting cards for carding wool and tow. She also found time to braid bonnets made from Junegrass, and for some kinds of embroidery.

Anna's father was Episcopal in preference, and one of the first books she remembered to have read aside from the Bible in the Sunday School was the Episcopal Prayer-book, there being but few books in the family's library, and Anna being hungry for knowledge.

Career

Western New York
About six weeks of this time, during the school vacation, she attended a school at Albion, and in November 1837, entered Miss Phipps' Union Seminary, (one of the first female institutions of the State), as a permanent scholar. About one year later, Sill was employed in the school as a teacher, probably pursuing her studies at the same time. Here she remained for more than five years, until July 1843.

Sill was inclined early in life toward the foreign missionary field, but when an opportunity came for her to go to India, she had become convinced that her mission was, in part, to prepare others for the field. Having determined to leave Albion, in hopes of finding a field of still greater usefulness, her thoughts were turned toward "The West," as a field of missionary and educational labor. She wrote to Rev. Hiram Foote, then in Racine, Wisconsin, with whom she had some acquaintance, inquiring if he knew of any opening for such work. "I have thought perhaps I might be useful as a teacher, and if possible establish a female seminary in some of the western states. Pecuniary considerations would have but little influence in such an undertaking. My principal object is to do good."

Not receiving any favorable reply, she went alone and almost unfriended, to Warsaw, New York, and there, after many discouragements, succeeded in opening a Seminary for young ladies, October 2, 1843. This undertaking was the first Seminary entirely under her own control. Before the close of the year, the school numbered 140 scholars. She continued this seminary about 2.5 years, and closed it in March, 1846.

In August, 1846, after thinking through whether to go to the West, or to offer herself to the Foreign Missionary field, she was invited by the trustees of the Cary Collegiate Institute, in Oakfield, Genesee County, New York, to take charge of the female department in that institution. This invitation she accepted, and Sill taught there as preceptress until the spring of 1849. Scanty record is made in her journal of her work at Cary Collegiate Institute, but the school was described as "prosperous". She had the care, some of the time, of about eighty young women with probably over 200 different ones under her care overall. While here, she had many applications to go elsewhere; one to take charge of the Seminary at Albion, and also to go as Principal at Le Roy, New York, but she decided to remain in Oakfield another year. During that year, she had applications from Michigan, Vermont, Lockport, New York, and again from Le Roy. All these she declined. She had long desired to labor in a more 'destitute' field, if not as a Foreign Missionary then in the "Northwest".

Northern Illinois
While Sill was employed in western New York, the pioneers of Christian education in what was then the "Northwest U.S." were planning how to carry out their views of higher education for young men and women by establishing collegiate institutions of the best New England type. Co-education had not at that time proved a complete success; nor was the idea of furnishing exactly the same education for both sexes then considered. The diversity in the sphere of life and employment opportunities for each seemed at that time to require a somewhat different curriculum of study and method of training, for which separate institutions were demanded. Accordingly, they resolved after a series of conventions, representing especially the Congregational and Presbyterian ministers and churches of the Northwest, to establish a college at Beloit, Wisconsin, and a Seminary in Northern Illinois. This was afterwards located at Rockford, and a board of trustees was elected to whom was committed the development and care of both institutions. The college began its corporate existence in 1845, and the Seminary in 1847, although it did not go into operation until a few years later.

Friends of the enterprise in Rockford, who had heard of Sill's success and reputation as a teacher, prominent among whom was the Rev. L. H. Loss, then pastor of the Congregational Church, wrote to her concerning the new enterprise and invited her to come to Rockford and open a school for young ladies as preparatory to the future Seminary.

Sill accepted the invitation, left the Cary institution May 10, 1849, and reach Rockford on May 24. Her motives in accepting this call included that it was a larger field of usefulness than any she had heretofore occupied. It was believed to be a missionary work, the laying of Christian foundations for future generations. On May 29, she sent an advertisement to the press. School commenced on July 11, opening with 53 scholars, and the following day, there were 60, holding recitations in the city's old courthouse building.

In those days a person direct from the Eastern United States commanded especial respect. The discouragements were manifold. The seats were low, and the sun came through windows with no curtains, causing complaints. Sill opened a modest boarding-house, and with the funds earned, improved the schoolroom, bought the books needed, placed curtains in the windows, and prevailed upon the students to supply desks.

The immediate and large success of the school, which soon outgrew its accommodations, demonstrated the felt need and demand for higher female education in the growing West, and it was very soon recognized as the beginning of the Rockford Seminary.

In 1851, the first class, fifteen in number, entered upon their course. In July 1852, Sill was elected principal. She had intense sympathy with the educational work of Mary Lyon, and early set before her Mount Holyoke Seminary as the model after which this new seminary was to be built. The aims, the methods and the whole spirit and character of the former were adopted by the latter, and there was a corresponding energy and devotion in the character of the two women.

In June, 1852, the corner stone of the first seminary building was laid, and it was completed in the fall of 1853. It was at once filled to overflowing, some four or five occupying a single boarding room, and about 100 applications were refused. The resources of Rockford seemed exhausted, at least of the few who were able or willing to give, and means for enlargement had to be obtained, or the enterprise would fail. Sill's health was giving way under the accumulated pressure, and she was constrained to go East in December, 1853, for the double purpose of improving her health and fundraising. With this, the foundation of another building was laid, but erected slowly with borrowed money to complete it, the debt being secured by mortgage on the property.

Appeals were sent out to friends of Christian education, and Sill again visited New England and secured funds for the completion of another building, a chapel with connecting wings. During these years, while responsible for the business issues of the institution, she not only continued the personal instruction of her classes, and superintended the management of the school, but she took an active and often a leading part in the social and religious life of the community, attending regularly the prayer meetings and other meetings of the Church, teaching a Bible-class in the Sunday School, mingling in social circles and contributing her personal influence as appropriate. Through Sill's efforts, an Education Society was formed at an early day by the women of Rockford, as a form of Christian benevolence for those who were very anxious to be educated, but could not afford to pay for it.

Later life
In the summer of 1884, after 35 years of leadership, Sill resigned her position as Principal of the Seminary, and retired to the position of Principal Emerita. The way for such a transition had been prepared for her by her pupils. This was now applied to the use for which it was raised. Her own rooms in the semimary were reserved for her exclusive use and occupancy so long as she might live, or desire it.

Sill accepted her retirement gracefully. She had taken much interest in the growth of the Art department, and some of her friends proposed to her a European tour, for the double purpose of recreation and health and of collecting pictures for an art gallery. But the travel did not occur, Sill giving herself to more quiet, domestic endeavors. Another department which she had long hoped to see provided for, a gymnasium, was erected and named "Sill Hall".

In the spring of 1889, her last surviving brother, his wife and two children, died of pneumonia within a few weeks of each other. Soon after, Sill experienced a slight attack of the same disease while on a visit to her niece, Mrs. A. M. Chapman, at Ridgeland, near Chicago, where Sill was accustomed to staying when away from Rockford. She rallied from the illness but under the advise of her physician, about the middle of May, she returned to her rooms at the Rockford seminary. On "Founder's Day", June 11, she stayed in her room, and did not go to the chapel for the evening service, but instead went to bed early. She never got out of bed thereafter, the pneumonia having returned. She spoke little while ill during her last eight days.

Anna Peck Sill died in her room in the seminary, June 18, 1889. The funeral was held in the Seminary Chapel, and interrment was in the West Side Cemetery, Rockford.

References

1816 births
1889 deaths
Founders of schools in the United States
Women founders
Educators from New York (state)
Educators from Illinois
People from Otsego County, New York
People from Rockford, Illinois